The Hell Cat is a 1934 pre-Code American crime film directed by Albert S. Rogell and starring Robert Armstrong, Ann Sothern and Benny Baker.

Cast
Robert Armstrong as Dan Collins
Ann Sothern as Geraldine Sloane 
Benny Baker as Snapper Dugan
Minna Gombell as Pauline McCoy
Purnell Pratt as the butler
Charles C. Wilson as Graham
J. Carrol Naish as Joe Morgan
Irving Bacon as Regan
 Henry Kolker as C.W. Sloane
 Guy Usher as Gillette
 Joseph Crehan as Capt. Barnett
 Ray Mayer as Evans
 Stanley Blystone as Chief Boatswain Mate
 Eddy Chandler as Scotty
 Harry Tenbrook as Sandy

References

1934 films
Columbia Pictures films
American black-and-white films
1934 crime drama films
American crime drama films
Films directed by Albert S. Rogell
1930s English-language films
1930s American films